"Somebody to Love Me" is the third single taken from Record Collection, the third studio album by Mark Ronson, released under the moniker Mark Ronson & The Business Intl. The song features Boy George and Andrew Wyatt on vocals.

Music video
The video for the track, directed by Saam Farahmand, was released on 14 October 2010. It features a club party in a home video style theme, with the date stamp "14.6.1982" - or 14 June 1982, which was Boy George's 21st birthday. However neither Ronson, Boy George or Andrew Wyatt feature in the video. Diane Kruger stars as Boy George. On the 21 December 2018 episode of The Graham Norton Show (S24E12) featuring Emily Blunt, Lin-Manuel Miranda, Ben Whishaw, Emily Mortimer, Boy George, and Culture Club, Boy George disclosed that Emily Blunt was originally asked to play him for the video but she was unavailable/declined.

Charts

The song also reached number 10 in Australia's Triple J Hottest 100 for 2010.

Release history

References

2010 singles
Mark Ronson songs
Song recordings produced by Mark Ronson
Songs written by Cathy Dennis
Songs written by Jake Shears
2010 songs
Songs written by Mark Ronson
Columbia Records singles
Songs written by Andrew Wyatt
Songs written by Anthony Rossomando
Songs written by K'naan
Songs written by Nick Movshon